Marina Tamayo (September 27, 1919 – September 20, 2005) was a Mexican film actress. She appeared in seventeen films during the Golden age of Mexican cinema.

Selected filmography
 Heads or Tails (1937)
 These Men (1937)
 In the Times of Don Porfirio (1940)
 The Eternal Secret (1942)
 The Black Angel (1942)

References

External links

Mexican film actresses
20th-century Mexican actresses
Actresses from Monterrey
1919 births
2005 deaths